Innenstadt is the central borough (Stadtbezirk) of the City of Cologne in Germany.

The borough was established with the last communal land reform in 1975, and comprises Cologne's historic old town (Altstadt), the Gründerzeit era new town (Neustadt) plus the right-Rhenish quarter of Deutz. The Innenstadt has about 127,000 inhabitants (as of December 2020) and covers an area of 16.37 square kilometres.

Subdivisions 
The Innenstadt is made up of five Stadtteile (city parts):

Landmarks 
Among the landmarks in Innenstadt are Cologne Cathedral, the twelve romanesque churches of Cologne (St. Andreas, St. Aposteln, St. Cäcilien, St. Georg, St. Gereon, St. Kunibert, St. Maria im Kapitol, St. Maria Lyskirchen, Groß St. Martin, St. Pantaleon, St. Severin and St. Ursula) and the 14th century Cologne City Hall (Kölner Rathaus). Several high rise structures were built over the last years as landmarks for Veedel (city quarters) within the district, most notably KölnTurm at MediaPark and the three Kranhaus buildings at Rheinauhafen.

Transportation 

As the business center of Cologne, the Innenstadt is well served by numerous railway stations and highway. The largest train station is Köln Hauptbahnhof, other stations include Köln Messe/Deutz, Köln Hansaring, Köln West and Köln Süd station, as well as a dense net of Cologne Stadtbahn tram and U-Bahn stations. The Cologne Ring (Kölner Ringe) is a city boulevard, encircling the old town of Cologne. It is part of Bundesstraße 55 and picks up several principal arterial roads, which lead into adjacent city districts.

Rhine bridges 
  Zoobrücke
  Hohenzollernbrücke
 Deutzer Brücke
  Severinsbrücke

See also 
 History of Cologne

References

External links 

 Official webpage of the district 

 
Boroughs and quarters of Cologne
Cologne